Segundo Tuculet (born 5 February 1994) is an Argentine rugby union player who currently plays for Valence Romans Drôme in the French ProD2. He has spent most of career playing sevens rugby with the Argentine national team.

Super Rugby

Tuculet played one match for the Jaguares during the 2016 Super Rugby season.   Starting as an outside-centre, he was replaced after 58 minutes and didn't feature again during the campaign.

International career

Tuculet represented Argentina internationally at rugby sevens in 2014 and 2015 competing in seven World Rugby Sevens Series events.

Super Rugby Statistics

References

1994 births
Living people
Argentine rugby union players
Rugby union fullbacks
Rugby union centres
Jaguares (Super Rugby) players
Sportspeople from La Plata
Male rugby sevens players
Argentina international rugby sevens players
US Montauban players
Rugby Club I Medicei players
Argentine expatriate rugby union players
Argentine expatriate sportspeople in Italy
Argentine expatriate sportspeople in France
Ealing Trailfinders Rugby Club players
Argentine expatriate sportspeople in England
RC Narbonne players